Cell division cycle protein 16 homolog is a protein that in humans is encoded by the CDC16 gene.

Function 

This gene encodes a component protein of the APC complex, which is composed of eight proteins and functions as a protein ubiquitin ligase. The APC complex is a cyclin degradation system that governs exit from mitosis. Each component protein of the APC complex is highly conserved among eukaryotic organisms. This protein and two other APC complex proteins, CDC23 and CDC27, contain a tetratricopeptide repeat (TPR), a protein domain that may be involved in protein-protein interaction. Multiple alternatively spliced variants, encoding the same protein, have been identified.

Interactions 

CDC16 has been shown to interact with CDC27 and CDC20.

References

External links

Further reading